{{DISPLAYTITLE:C21H36}}
The molecular formula C21H36 (molar mass: 288.52 g/mol, exact mass: 288.2817 u) may refer to:

 Allopregnane, or 5α-Pregnane
 Pregnane, also known as 17β-ethylandrostane
 5β-Pregnane

Molecular formulas